The Charles Williams Jr. House, built in 1858, is a historic house in Somerville, Massachusetts. Charles Williams Jr. was a manufacturer of electrical telegraph instruments at 109 Court Street in Boston. Alexander Graham Bell and Thomas A. Watson experimented with the telephone in Williams' shop, and it was there that they first heard indistinct sounds transmitted on June 2, 1875. The first permanent residential telephone service in the world was installed at this house in 1877, connecting Williams' home with his shop on Court Street in Boston. Williams had telephone Numbers 1 and 2 of the Bell Telephone Company.

See also
National Register of Historic Places listings in Somerville, Massachusetts

References

Houses on the National Register of Historic Places in Somerville, Massachusetts
Alexander Graham Bell